Las Meninas (Spanish for The Maids of Honour) is a 2008 Ukrainian film directed by  Ihor Podolchak. Its title alludes to the well-known painting by Diego Velázquez, Las Meninas. Ihor Podolchak was the producer, screenwriter, and director of this film. Las Meninas was produced by MF Films (a subdivision of Masoch Fund). It was the first Ukrainian film to participate in the Tiger Awards Competition of the International Film Festival Rotterdam. As of the beginning of 2011, the film has participated in 27 international film festivals, including 10 competition programs. In 2011, it was included in Top 15 Best Ukrainian films of the 20 years' Independence period.

Plot

The film is about what the routine of everyday life can do to the human mind and psyche. It also reflects on the importance of the choices we make and how limited these choices are in the first place. The plot evolves around a family of four. They live in the suburbs, in a strange villa that appears, through a complex game of mirrors, to be more like a piece of installation art than a real house. The main character, who hardly appears on screen, is the son, a man in his thirties. Suffering from asthma and eczema since childhood, he uses his condition to manipulate his parents and his sister.  Thus the existence of the terrorized family turns into an endless ritual of attempting to satisfy his whims, and always on the alert for yet another one of his "health crises".
Las Meninas resembles the scattered pieces of a puzzle. It is up to the viewer to assemble them in order to form his very own picture – something that makes the film itself personal and unique.

Cast
 Mykola Veresen as Father, Second Father, Young Father
 Lyubov Tymoshevska as Mother
 Hanna Yarovenko as Daughter
 Dmytro Chernyavsky as Son
 Ilona Arsentyeva as Daughter (girl)
 Stas Arsentyev as Son (boy)
 Viktoriya Ulyanchenko as Young Mother
 Valeriya Ulyanchenko as Young Mother

Production

The idea for the script appeared in 2004, inspired by Doctor Janos Sanocky's account of a case from his medical practice. The dialogue was co-written by the Lithuanian-Russian writer Andrey Levkin.
The shooting of the film took place between September 15 and October 24, 2006, in Kyiv. Most of the film was shot through the mirrors, which caused serious difficulties for the director of photography, since there was a permanent challenge for the crew to avoid getting into the shot.
Editing, effects, color correction, and rendering of the film took 14 months. All post-production work except for rendering was done by Ihor Podolchak himself. Las Meninas was the first feature film in Ukraine created entirely with the Digital intermediate process.
Most of the music in the film was written for cello and piano by composer Alexander Shchetynsky. Director and composer paid attention to the central role of music as a semantic counterpoint to the dialogue and visual imagery, so the sound level of the film can be viewed as an integral sound installation. American video clip director Dean Karr co-directed the music part of the film.

Releases and Reception
Las Meninas had a world premiere at the International Film Festival Rotterdam on January 25, 2008. During 2008–2011, the film participated in competition programs of the international film festivals in Brazil, Croatia, Russia, Poland, Slovakia, Spain, Romania, Italy, and Hungary; in non-competition programs in Germany, South Korea, France, Australia, Greece, UK, Colombia, Estonia, USA, Sweden, and South Africa. It was also included in the official selections of the Moscow International Film Festival and the Karlovy Vary International Film Festival.

The critics noted the film's "beautiful imagery" and praised the camerawork of Serhiy Mykhalchuk. Ukrainian premiere of the film took place on June 9, 2009 at the Festival of the European Cinema in Kyiv. Theatrical release in Ukraine was on October 5, 2009. The film received mixed reviews in Ukraine. The critical opinions were polarized – from aversion and accusations of being "artificial" to apologetics and high appreciation of the film's art quality and its break with the tradition of the so-called "Ukrainian Soviet cinema".

External links

 
 Las Meninas at Columbia University
 Las Meninas on YouTube
 Las Meninas. Script and documentation on issuu
 Las Meninas. Press 2008-2009 on issuu
 Las Meninas on Facebook

Sources 
 Flashback. Українське медіа-мистецтво 1990-х. Ukrainian media art of the 1990s. Catalog. Curators: Oleksandr Solovyov, Solomiya Savchuk. Київ: ДП НКММК Мистецький Арсенал, 2018. — 180 p. pp 16, 24, 40-41, 117  
 International Film Guide 2009: the definitive annual review of world cinema, edited by Haydn Smith. 45th Edition. London & New York: Wallflower Press 2009 
 Pethő, Ágnes. The Cinema of Sensations. Cambridge: Cambridge Scholars Publishing, 2015, pp. 155–182,  
 Бейкер Марія. Роттердам смотрит кино из Украины и Казахстана., Радіо BBC, 23 января 2008 
 Космолінська Наталка. Ігор Подольчак, Ігор Дюрич: У тому, що Україну представлятимуть галичани, є історична справедливість., „Поступ/Брама“ — No. 28(686) 
 Корниенко C. Las Meninas. Очень авторский фильм. svobodanews.ru, 19.02.08 
 Куровець, О. ''Las Meninas: „Обережно, артхаус!“», «Телекритика», 15-06-2009 
 Купінська, А. Десять українських фільмів до річниці незалежності, life.pravda.com.ua, 24.08.2011 
 Ложкина, А. ''Я мало думаю о зрителе" «Top10», Sep., 2009 
 Плахов Андрій. Роттердамские угодники. «Коммерсантъ», No. 16/П(3833), 04.02.2008 
 Шпилюк А. Игорь Подольчак покоряет голландские высоты. «Коммерсант Украина», No. 8 от 23.01.2008, СР

References

2008 films
2008 independent films
Films shot in Ukraine
Films directed by Ihor Podolchak
Neo-noir
Nonlinear narrative films
Surrealist films
Psychodrama
2008 drama films
Ukrainian drama films